Eileen Yin-Fei Lo (May 4, 1937 – November 13, 2022) was a chef. She authored eleven cookbooks on Chinese cuisine.

Early life and education

China 
Lo was born in Shun Tak, a district of Guangdong, China. At the age of five, she began to cook which was encouraged by her parents, particularly her mother who believed that "children should know how to do everything", and a father who had traveled widely and was familiar with foreign cuisines. Early influences also included her grandmother who instilled in her the techniques and culture of cooking while she was still a child.

Hong Kong 
In 1950, Lo fled the Chinese Revolution to live with relatives in Hong Kong. While there she learned English and further enhanced her knowledge of cooking by researching cuisines from all of the regions of China and taking lessons from an aunt who was herself a highly accomplished cook.

Career

United States 
After moving to the United States, she was urged by friends to teach Chinese cookery which she began to do in the early 1970s. For many years she taught in her home, from beginners to master classes. In 1976, she was invited to join the cooking and nutrition staff of the China Institute in New York City and taught there for more than twenty years. She has also taught Chinese cookery at The New School University in New York City.

Personal life and death 
In 1959, Lo married Fred Ferretti, an American journalist she met in Hong Kong while he was on assignment for the military newspaper, Stars and Stripes. She moved with him to the United States, initially living in Queens, New York.

Lo died on November 13, 2022, in Montclair, New Jersey. She was survived by her son, Stephen Ferretti.

Published cookbooks
 Mastering the Art of Chinese Cooking
 The Dim Sum Book:  Classic Recipes from the Chinese Teahouse
 The Chinese Banquet Cookbook
 Eileen Yin-Fei Lo’s New Cantonese Cooking
 From the Earth:  Chinese Vegetarian Cooking
 The Dim Sum Dumpling Book
 The Chinese Way: Healthy Low-Fat Cooking from China’s Regions
 The Chinese Kitchen
 The Chinese Chicken Cookbook
 My Grandmother’s Chinese Kitchen
 China’s Food, with Lionel Tiger (A photographic study and survey of great Chinese regional cooking)

Awards
 Mastering The Art of Chinese Cooking was a winner of the International Association of Culinary Professionals (IACP) Julia Child Award and nominated for The James Beard Award
 The Chinese Banquet Book Cookbook was an IACP Julia Child Award winner 
 The Dim Sum Book was nominated for an IACP Julia Child Award 
 From the Earth:  Chinese Vegetarian Cooking was nominated for an IACP Julia Child Award and The James Beard Award

Honors
 Silver Spoon Award - Food Arts magazine (New York, 2007)
 Lifetime Achievement Award - La Celebration Culinaire Internationale (Washington D.C., 2001)
 Lifetime Achievement Award - New World Festival of Food and Wine (Singapore, China 1998)
 James Beard House Dinner - 'Little Dishes East and West' (New York, 1998)
 James Beard Awards – One of a group of chefs to cook for the James Beard Awards 10th Anniversary Gala (New York, 1996)

Organizations
Lo has been associated with the following organizations over her career:
 Food Arts (New York), Asian food authority
 Les Dames d’Escoffier (New York), Member
 China Institute (New York), cooking instructor
 New School Culinary Arts (New York), cooking instructor

Newspaper and magazine articles
Lo has written on both food and restaurants for:
 The New York Times
 The New York Times Magazine
 Gourmet magazine
 Food & Wine
 Travel + Leisure 
 Food Arts (master class article contributor)

Media appearances and cooking demonstrations
Lo has appeared on Martha Stewart Living (syndicated), The Early Show (CBS), Good Morning America (ABC), Today in New York (WNBC), Fox and Family (FOX) and on Food Network, as well as regional U.S. programs and programs in Singapore, the United Kingdom, Italy, Finland, Canada and New Zealand.

References 

Year of birth missing (living people)
Chinese emigrants to the United States
American cookbook writers
American chefs
The New School faculty
Writers from Guangzhou
Educators from Guangdong
Vegetarian cookbook writers
Women cookbook writers
Chinese cookbook writers
Chinese Civil War refugees
American women non-fiction writers
American women academics
21st-century American women
1937 births
2022 deaths